The 2019 World Wheelchair-B Curling Championship were held from November 27 to December 2 in Lohja, Finland. The championship was used to qualify three teams for the 2020 World Wheelchair Curling Championship in Wetzikon, Switzerland.

In the final, Canada defeated Sweden by a score of 6-1. This meant Canada, Sweden and bronze medal winners Czech Republic all qualified for the 2020 World Championships.

Teams
{| class="wikitable"
!width=250|
!width=250|
!width=250|
!width=250|
|-
|
Fourth: Jon Thurston
Third: Ina Forrest
Second: Marie Wright
Skip: Mark Ideson
Alternate: Dennis Thiessen
Coach: Wayne Kiel
|
Fourth: Radek Musílek
Skip: Dana Selnekovičová
Second: Martin Tluk
Lead: Jana Břinčilová
Alternate: Štěpán Beneš
Coach: Helena Barkmanova, Kateřina Urbanová
|
Skip: Kenneth Ørbæk
Third: Helle Christiansen
Second: Jack Brendle
Lead: Michael Jensen
Alternate: Sussie Nielsen
Coach: Per Christensen
|
Fourth: Stewart Pimblett
Skip: Rosemary Lenton
Second: Edward Bidgood
Lead: Paul Simmons
Coach: Tony Lenton
|-
!width=250|
!width=250|
!width=250|
!width=250|
|-
|
Fourth: Harri Tuomaala
Skip: Juha Rajala
Second: Teemu Klasila
Lead: Riitta Särösalo
Alternate: Pekka Pälsynaho
Coach: Vesa Kokko
|
Skip: Christiane Putzich
Third: Burkhard Möller
Second: Wolf Meissner
Lead: Heike Melchior
Alternate: Melanie Spielmann
Coach: Helmar Erlewein, Jamie Boutin
|
Fourth: Péter Barkóczi
Skip: Viktor Beke
Second: Anikó Sasadi
Lead: Rita Sárai
Coach: Olivér Kerekes
|
Fourth: Egidio Marchese
Skip: Paolo Ioriatti
Second: Gabriele Dallapiccola
Lead: Angela Menardi
Alternate: Orietta Berto
Coach: Violetta Caldart, Amanda Bianchi
|-
!width=250|
!width=250|
!width=250|
!width=250|
|-
|
Skip: Takashi Sakataya
Third: Kazuhiro Kashiwabara
Second: Tsutomu Iwata
Lead: Kana Matsuda
Alternate: Hiromi TakahashiCoach: Tsutomu Kobayashi, Hiroya Sato
|
Skip: Andrej Daškevič
Third: Jurij Savickij
Second: Jevgenijus Pyževskis
Lead: Reda Pociūtė
Coach: Arnis Veidemanis
|
Fourth: Antoni Pardo
Third: Mariusz Włodarski
Skip: Michał Daszkowski
Lead: Joanna Kozakiewicz
Alternate: Łukasz WaszekCoach: Jeremi Telak
|
Fourth: Robert Žerovnik
Skip: Žiga Bajde
Second: Jože Klemen
Lead: Jovita Jeglič
Coach: Gregor Verbinc
|-
!width=250|
!width=250|
!width=250|
!width=250|
|-
|
Skip: Viljo Petersson-Dahl
Third: Mats-Ola Engborg
Second: Ronny Persson
Lead: Kristina Ulander
Alternate: Zandra ReppeCoach: Alison Kreviazuk, Peter Narup
|
Fourth: Züleyha Bingöl
Third: Kenan Coşkun
Second: Turan Akalın
Skip: Savaş Şimşek
Alternate: Deren ÖzgenCoach: Gökçe Ulugay, Soner Doğan
|
Skip: Stephen Emt
Third: Matthew Thums
Second: David Samsa
Lead: Meghan Lino
Alternate: Pamela WilsonCoach: Rusty Schieber
|
|}

Round-robin standingsFinal round-robin standingsRound-robin results

All draws are listed in Eastern European Time (UTC+02:00).

Draw 1Wednesday, November 27, 16:30Draw 2Wednesday, November 27, 20:00Draw 3Thursday, November 28, 08:30Draw 4Thursday, November 28, 12:00Draw 5Thursday, November 28, 15:30Draw 6Thursday, November 28, 19:00Draw 7Friday, November 29, 09:30Draw 8Friday, November 29, 14:30Draw 9Friday, November 29, 18:30Draw 10Saturday, November 30, 08:30Draw 11Saturday, November 30, 12:00Draw 12Saturday, November 30, 15:30Draw 13Saturday, November 30, 19:00Draw 14Sunday, December 1, 09:30Playoffs

Qualification gamesSunday, December 1, 18:005th place gameMonday, December 2, 09:00SemifinalsMonday, December 2, 09:00Bronze medal gameMonday, December 2, 14:30FinalMonday, December 2, 14:30''

See also
2019 World Wheelchair Curling Championship

References

External links

World Wheelchair Curling Championship
2019 in curling
International curling competitions hosted by Finland